Tony O'Connor is a former international rower from Ireland. He is a double Olympian who represented Ireland and won five medals at the World Championships as part of a lightweight pair. In 2016, Tony also coached at the Southern Rowing Performance Centre.

A member of the Shannon and Neptune Rowing Clubs, he holds the record for most senior Irish Rowing Championship wins (21). He has won 5 medals at the World Rowing Championships in the Men's Lightweight Pair: Gold in 2001; Silvers in 1996 and 1997: Bronzes in 1994 and 1999. He and partner Neville Maxwell held the World Best Time for Men's Lightweight Pair, 6:26.61 set at Paris in 1994. He has been twice an Olympian, finishing 4th in the Men's Lightweight Coxless Four in Atlanta 1996, and 11th in the same event at Sydney 2000.

Tony O'Connor is also the coach for the New Zealand men's eight, which won gold at the 2020 Summer Olympics.

References

Living people
Olympic rowers of Ireland
Rowers at the 1996 Summer Olympics
Rowers at the 2000 Summer Olympics
Irish male rowers
World Rowing Championships medalists for Ireland
Olympic rowers
1969 births